Indra Gunawan (born 21 March 1988) is an Indonesian swimmer. He competed in the men's 50 metre breaststroke event at the 2017 World Aquatics Championships.

References

External links
 

1988 births
Living people
Indonesian male swimmers
Indonesian people of Chinese descent
Place of birth missing (living people)
Swimmers at the 2010 Asian Games
Swimmers at the 2018 Asian Games
Southeast Asian Games medalists in swimming
Southeast Asian Games gold medalists for Indonesia
Competitors at the 2017 Southeast Asian Games
Asian Games competitors for Indonesia
Male breaststroke swimmers
Islamic Solidarity Games competitors for Indonesia
21st-century Indonesian people